Nebulosa bialbifera is a moth of the family Notodontidae. It is found in Ecuador.

References

Moths described in 1904
Notodontidae of South America